Schorer is a surname. Notable people with the surname include:

 Cornelia Schorer (1863–1939), German physician
 Mark Schorer (1908–1977), American writer and scholar
 Suki Schorer, American ballet dancer, ballet mistress, teacher, and writer

See also
 Schober
 Schorr